O. glaber  may refer to:
 Ochetellus glaber, the black house ant, an ant species
 Oxychilus glaber, an air-breathing land snail species found in the Czech Republic

See also
  Glaber (disambiguation)